
Year 301 BC was a year of the pre-Julian Roman calendar. At the time, it was known as the Year of the Dictatorship of Corvus (or, less frequently, year 453 Ab urbe condita). The denomination 301 BC for this year has been used since the early medieval period, when the Anno Domini calendar era became the prevalent method in Europe for naming years.

Events 
 By place 
 Asia Minor 
 In the Battle of Ipsus in Phrygia, the armies of Antigonus, the ruler of Syria, Asia Minor, Phoenicia and Judea, and his son Demetrius Poliorcetes are defeated by the forces of Lysimachus and Seleucus. Antigonus is killed in the battle.
 Antigonus' defeat and death secures Cassander's control of Macedonia. Through this victory, Lysimachus is able to add the greater part of Asia Minor to his European possessions while Seleucus now controls most of Syria. However, Demetrius is able to keep a foothold in Greece.

 Seleucid Empire 
 The southern part of Syria is occupied by Ptolemy.

Births

Deaths 
 Antigonus I Monophthalmus, Macedonian general under Alexander the Great who founded and became the first king of the Macedonian dynasty of the Antigonids (b. 382 BC)
 Aristobulus of Cassandreia, Greek historian (b. ca. 375 BC)

References